30th Brigade or 30th Infantry Brigade may refer to:

 30th Brigade (Australia), an infantry unit of the Australian Army
 30th Mechanized Infantry Brigade (Greece), a unit of the Greek Army
 30th Indian Brigade of the British Indian Army in the First World War
 30th Indian Infantry Brigade of the British Indian Army in the Second World War
 30th Mixed Brigade, a unit of the Spanish Republican Army in the Spanish Civil War
 30th Mechanized Brigade (Ukraine), a unit of the Ukrainian Ground Forces
 30th Armored Brigade Combat Team, a unit of the United States Army

Units of the United Kingdom:
 30th (Northumbrian) Anti-Aircraft Brigade
 30th Armoured Brigade
 30th Brigade (United Kingdom), 1914–1918
 30th Infantry Brigade (United Kingdom)
 30th (Howitzer) Brigade Royal Field Artillery

See also
 30th Army (disambiguation)
 30th Battalion (disambiguation)
 XXX Corps (disambiguation)
 30th Division (disambiguation)
 30th Regiment (disambiguation)
 30th Squadron (disambiguation)
 30th Squadron (disambiguation)